This list of Berenstain Bears books includes many in the picture book series (such as "Beginner Books" and "First Time Books") and the illustrated children's novels, such as those in the "Big Chapter Books" series. Since the first Berenstain Bears installment was published in 1962, the series has sold close to 260 million copies.

In addition to writing children's literature, the authors Stan and Jan Berenstain also wrote three books that feature the Berenstain Bears: two parenting books, What Your Parents Never Told You About Being a Mom or Dad (1995) and The Berenstain Bears and the Bear Essentials (2005), and their autobiography, Down a Sunny Dirt Road (2002).

Publication summary
Titles marked with an asterisk (*) were adapted into episodes of the 1985 cartoon series.

Titles marked with two asterisks (**) were adapted into episodes of the 2003 cartoon series.

References

External links
The following list contains all Berenstain Bears storybooks and activity/coloring books, as well as non-Bears books by the Berenstains.
Complete Berenstain Bears Bibliography

Lists of American books
Lists of children's books
List book

it:Gli orsi Berenstain